Banyum (Banyun), Nyun, or Bainouk, is a Senegambian dialect cluster of Senegal and Guinea-Bissau.

Spellings are Bagnoun, Banhum, Banyung and Bainuk, Banyuk; other names are Elomay ~ Elunay; for the Gunyaamolo variety Ñuñ or Nyamone, and for Gunyuño Guñuun or Samik. The language is referred to as gu-jaaxər by its speakers.

See Baïnounk Gubëeher for the phonology of a closely related language, sometimes thought to be a dialect of Banyum.

Varieties
There are three varieties of Banyum: Baïnouk-gunyaamolo, Baïnouk Samik, and Baïnouk gunyuño.

 Bainouk-Gunyaamolo is spoken by 30,000 people in 2013. It is spoken in the northern Casamance River area, within a triangle formed by the towns of Bignona, Tobor and Niamone or north of Ziguinchor. It is also spoken in Gambia.
 Baïnouk-Samik is spoken by 1,850 people in 2006. It is found mainly on the left bank of the Casamance River, around Samik and surrounding villages, approximately 20 km east of Ziguinchor.
 Baïnouk-Gunyuño (Bainounk-Gujaher) is spoken by 8,860 people in 2006. It is found in the region of Cacheu and near São Domingos in Guinea-Bissau.

References

Senegambian languages
Languages of Senegal
Languages of Guinea-Bissau